Tous dans l'même bateau (All in the Same Boat) was the debut album by the Canadian progressive rock group, CANO. Released in 1976, the album was produced by Luc Cousineau and Jon Red Mitchell.

In 2021, two of the album's classic songs, André Paiement's "Dimanche après-midi" and Marcel Aymar's "Baie Sainte-Marie," were inducted into the Canadian Songwriters Hall of Fame.

Track listing
 "Viens nous voir" (8:35)
 "Dimanche après-midi" (3:41)
 "Pluie estivale" (2:53)
 "Le vieux Médéric" (2:59)
 "Les rues d'Ottawa" (3:49)
 "En plein hiver" (9:30)
 "Chanson pour Suzie" (1:05)
 "Baie Sainte-Marie" (9:29)

References

1976 debut albums
CANO albums
A&M Records albums